Ephemerella is a genus of spiny crawler mayflies in the family Ephemerellidae. There are about 19 described species in Ephemerella.

Species
 E. alleni Jensen and Edmunds, 1966
 E. apopsis McCafferty, 1992
 E. aurivillii (Bengtsson, 1908)
 E. catawba Traver, 1932
 E. consimilis Walsh, 1862
 E. dorothea Needham, 1908
 E. excrucians Walsh, 1862 (pale morning dun)
 E. hispida Allen and Edmunds, 1965
 E. invaria (Walker, 1853) (sulphur dun)
 E. maculata Traver, 1934
 E. molita McDunnough, 1930
 E. mucronata (Bengtsson, 1909)
 E. needhami McDunnough, 1925
 E. nuda Tshernova, 1949
 E. subvaria McDunnough, 1931 (red quill)
 E. tibialis McDunnough, 1924
 E. unicornis Needham, 1905
 E. velmae Allen and Edmunds, 1963
 E. verruca Allen and Edmunds, 1965

References

 Walsh, Benjamin D. (1862). "List of the Pseudoneuroptera of Illinois contained in the Cabinet of the writer, with descriptions of over forty new species, and notes on their structural affinities". Proceedings of the Academy of Natural Sciences of Philadelphia, vol. 14, no. 7-9, 361-402.

Further reading

External links

 NCBI Taxonomy Browser, Ephemerella

Mayflies
Mayfly genera